The 1971 DFB-Pokal Final decided the winner of the 1970–71 DFB-Pokal, the 28th season of Germany's knockout football cup competition. It was played on 19 June 1971 at the Neckarstadion in Stuttgart. Bayern Munich won the match 2–1 after extra time against 1. FC Köln, to claim their 5th cup title.

Route to the final
The DFB-Pokal began with 32 teams in a single-elimination knockout cup competition. There were a total of four rounds leading up to the final. Teams were drawn against each other, and the winner after 90 minutes would advance. If still tied, 30 minutes of extra time was played. If the score was still level, a replay would take place at the original away team's stadium. If still level after 90 minutes, 30 minutes of extra time was played. If the score was still level, a penalty shoot-out was used to determine the winner.

Note: In all results below, the score of the finalist is given first (H: home; A: away).

Match

Details

References

External links
 Match report at kicker.de 
 Match report at WorldFootball.net
 Match report at Fussballdaten.de 

FC Bayern Munich matches
1. FC Köln matches
1970–71 in German football cups
1971
Sports competitions in Stuttgart
20th century in Stuttgart
June 1971 sports events in Europe